Laura Adler's Last Love Affair (also known as The Last Love Affair of Laura Adler) is a 1990 Israeli drama film written and directed by Avraham Heffner.  It was entered into the main competition at the 47th Venice International Film Festival.

Cast 

 Rita Zohar  : Laura  
 Menashe Warshavsky : Savitch 
 Avraham Mor : Menashe
 Shulamit Adar :  Becky

References

External links

1990 films
1990 drama films
Israeli drama films